Cinthya Gabriela López Soto (born 23 August 1993) is a Guatemalan footballer who plays as a midfielder. She has been a member of the Guatemala women's national team.

References

1993 births
Living people
Women's association football midfielders
Guatemalan women's footballers
Guatemala women's international footballers
Central American Games bronze medalists for Guatemala
Central American Games medalists in football